KGJX (101.5 FM) is a radio station licensed to Fruita, Colorado. The station broadcasts a classic hits format in HD Digital Stereo and is owned by Grand Junction Media, Inc.

In April 2019, the station rebranded as "101.5 The Junkyard", and switched from syndicated to local programming.

On July 7, 2022, KGJX rebranded as "Junction 101.5" with an 80s/90s-based classic hits format.

References

External links

GJX
Classic hits radio stations in the United States